The Manteca Transit Center is the primary public transit hub of Manteca, California. The bus station features five bus bays with Manteca Transit as the primary operator; the agency also maintain their offices at the facility. San Joaquin Regional Transit District and Altamont Corridor Express shuttle routes also serve the transit center. Modesto Area Express (now Stanislaus Regional Transit Authority) service began in July 2020. Altamont Corridor Express commuter rail service is expected to commence at a newly constructed platform along the Union Pacific rail line by 2026.

References

Manteca, California
Future Altamont Corridor Express stations
Altamont Corridor Express stations in San Joaquin County, California
Railway stations scheduled to open in 2026
2013 establishments in California
Bus stations in San Joaquin County, California